At least three warships of Japan have borne the name Asagiri:

 , a  launched in 1903 and stricken in 1926
 , a  launched in 1929 and sunk in 1942
 , an  launched in 1986

Japanese Navy ship names
Imperial Japanese Navy ship names